Anthurium cutucuense is a species of plant in the arum family, Araceae. It is endemic to Ecuador, where it is known from only two locations in Morona-Santiago and Zamora-Chinchipe Provinces. It is an epiphyte which grows in the forests of the lower Andes. Its most distinctive feature is three-lobed leaves which have a bullate texture.

References

cutucuense
Endangered plants
Endemic flora of Ecuador
Taxonomy articles created by Polbot